Gustavo Sabino Vaca Narvaja (born 8 April 1975) is an Argentine political scientist and diplomat, and the current ambassador of Argentina to the People's Republic of China.

Early life and education
Vaca Narvaja was born on 4 April 1975 in Córdoba, son of Fernando Vaca Narvaja and María Josefa Fleming. His father is a politician who was active in Montoneros, a leftist armed group, in the 1970s. Shortly after Sabino's birth, the family went into exile and settled in Cuba, where he was brought up.

Vaca Narvaja counts with a licenciatura degree on political science from the National University of Lanús (UNLa) and a postgraduate degree on national defense from the Universidad de la Defensa Nacional. He has taught courses at university level and conducted research in his field.

Career
An expert on China affairs, he led the Sino-Argentine co-operation programme (ProSA) of the UNLa Department of Planning and Public Policy. He was also Director General of International Affairs of the Argentine Senate from 2012 to 2015, and served as a legislative aide for the Front for Victory parliamentary bloc in the Senate as well.

In 2020, Vaca Narvaja was appointed to the Argentine Embassy in Beijing as special envoy for Commercial Promotion and Investments in China. In March 2021, the Argentine government appointed Vaca Narvaja as Argentine Ambassador in China, as a replacement for Luis María Kreckler, who never presented his credentials before the Chinese government. Vaca Narvaja presented his credentials on 15 April 2021.

In February 2022, Vaca Narvaja accompanied Argentine president Alberto Fernández on his first state visit to China, and oversaw the officialisation of Argentina's entry into the Belt and Road Initiative.

Publications
 (Editor)
 (Editor)

References

External links

Argentine Embassy in the People's Republic of China

1975 births
Living people
People from Córdoba, Argentina
Argentine diplomats
Argentine political scientists
Ambassadors of Argentina to China